is a former Japanese football player.

Playing career
Suzuki was born in Chiba Prefecture on October 4, 1973. After graduating from Chuo University, he joined Japan Football League club Tokyo Gas (later FC Tokyo) in 1996. In 1997, he became the club's starting goalkeeper in place of the injured Hiromitsu Horiike. Tokyo were promoted to the newly-formed J2 League in 1999, with Suzuki still their first-choice goalkeeper. He performed well as Tokyo finished second, earning promotion to the J1 League in 2000. However,  Yoichi Doi took his starting spot, which made him unsatisfied. He retired after the 2000 season.

Club statistics

References

External links

1973 births
Living people
Chuo University alumni
Association football people from Chiba Prefecture
Japanese footballers
J1 League players
J2 League players
Japan Football League (1992–1998) players
FC Tokyo players
Association football goalkeepers